The Primal Lure is a mostly lost 1916 silent film western directed by and starring William S. Hart. Footage surfaced in 2023 on YouTube.

Cast
 William S. Hart as Angus McConnell
 Margery Wilson as Lois Le Moyne
 Robert McKim as Richard Sylvester
 Jerome Storm as Pierre Vernaisse
 Joe Goodboy as Indian Chief

References

External links
 
 

1916 films
1916 Western (genre) films
Lost American films
Films directed by William S. Hart
Triangle Film Corporation films
Lost Western (genre) films
American black-and-white films
1916 lost films
Silent American Western (genre) films
1910s American films